The Bad Guy is a 2022 Italian crime drama television series directed by Giancarlo Fontana and Giuseppe G. Stasi. It was internationally released on Prime Video on 8 December 2022.

Cast

Main

Recurring

Guests
Valentina Bendicenti as herself
Enrico Mentana as himself
Andrea Purgatori as himself
Dalila Setti as herself
Tess Masazza as a guide in Wowterworld
Colapesce and Dimartino as the Wowterworld theme's singers
Frank Matano as the stage director

References

External links
 

Crime drama television series
2020s crime television series
Italian-language television shows
Italian crime television series
Television series about organized crime